Willy Schiller (11 August 1899 – 17 July 1973) was a German art director. In the later part of his career he worked for DEFA, the East German state-controlled film studio.

Selected filmography

 Radio Magic (1927)
 The Green Alley (1928)
 Don Juan in a Girls' School (1928)
 The Lady from Argentina (1928)
 Love in the Cowshed (1928)
 Only a Viennese Woman Kisses Like That (1928)
 The Night of Terror (1929)
 The Hound of the Baskervilles (1929)
 The Youths (1929)
 Distinguishing Features (1929)
 Yes, Yes, Women Are My Weakness (1929)
 Youthful Indiscretion (1929)
 Beware of Loose Women (1929)
 Secret Police (1929)
 The Woman Everyone Loves Is You (1929)
 The Daredevil Reporter (1929)
 From a Bachelor's Diary (1929)
 German Wine (1929)
 A Mother's Love (1929)
 Busy Girls (1930)
 Witnesses Wanted (1930)
 Man schenkt sich Rosen, wenn man verliebt ist (1930)
 Pariser Unterwelt (1930)
 Rag Ball (1930)
 The Man in the Dark (1930)
 Next, Please! (1930)
 Of Life and Death (1930)
 The Love Market (1930)
 Two People (1930)
 A Waltz by Strauss (1931)
 The Adventurer of Tunis (1931)
 Raid in St. Pauli (1932)
 Little Man, What Now? (1933)
 The Country Schoolmaster (1933)
 What Women Dream (1933)
 Ich sing' mich in dein Herz hinein (1934)
 Love, Death and the Devil (1934)
 The Devil in the Bottle (1935)
 Make Me Happy (1935)
 Les époux célibataires (1935)
The Green Domino (1935)
 The Green Domino (1935)
 Boccaccio (1936)
 Donogoo Tonka (1936)
 City of Anatol (1936)
 The Kreutzer Sonata (1937)
 Wells in Flames (1937)
The Chief Witness (1937)
 The Strange Monsieur Victor (1938)
 A Girl Goes Ashore (1938)
 Les nuits blanches de Saint-Pétersbourg (1938)
 Frau Sylvelin (1938)
 Drei Unteroffiziere (1939)
 Her First Experience (1939)
 Who's Kissing Madeleine? (1939)
 Liebesschule (1940)
 With the Eyes of a Woman (1942)
 The Big Number (1943)
 Kohlhiesel's Daughters (1943)
 Meine vier Jungens (1944)
 The Years Pass (1945)
 Hoegler's Mission (1950)
 Zugverkehr unregelmäßig (1951)
 Karriere in Paris (1952)
 Swings or Roundabouts (1953)
 Alarm at the Circus (1954)
 Genesung (1956)
 Polonia-Express (1957)
 Skimeister von morgen (1957)
 Der kleine Kuno (1959)
 Steinzeitballade (1961)

References

Bibliography
 Seán Allan & John Sandford. DEFA: East German Cinema, 1946-1992. Berghahn Books, 1999.

External links

1899 births
1973 deaths
German art directors
Film people from Berlin